The Furggeltihorn is a mountain of the Lepontine Alps, overlooking the Zervreilasee in the canton of Graubünden.

References

External links
 Furggeltihorn on Hikr

Mountains of the Alps
Alpine three-thousanders
Mountains of Switzerland
Mountains of Graubünden
Lepontine Alps
Vals, Switzerland